No Diamonds for Ursula (Italian: I diamanti che nessuno voleva rubare) is a 1967 Italian crime film directed by Gino Mangini and starring  Jeanne Valérie, Salvo Randone and Dana Andrews.

Cast
 Jeanne Valérie  as Ursula 
 Salvo Randone as Spiros 
 John Elliot as Fangio 
 Dana Andrews as Maurizio, Il gioielliere 
 Aldo Giuffrè  as Marcos 
 Mario Brega as Sansone 
 Bruno Piergentili as Giorgio
 Roger Beaumont as Charlie 
 Aymo as Edison 
 Lilly Mantovani as La governante 
 Kathy Baron as La commessa 
 Giovanni Petrucci as Il commesso 
 Ignazio Spalla as Caravella
 Thomas Walton as Il commissario 
 Nino Vingelli  as Carta Carbone 
 Attilio Dottesio  as Il maresciallo

References

Bibliography 
 James McKay. Dana Andrews: The Face of Noir. McFarland, 2010.

External links 
 

1967 films
Italian crime action films
1960s crime action films
Poliziotteschi films
1960s Italian-language films
Films directed by Gino Mangini
1960s Italian films